Claudia Elizabeth Lawrence (born 27 February 1974) is an English woman who was last seen and heard from on 18 March 2009. She was employed as a chef at the University of York's Goodricke College at the time of her disappearance. Although the police have treated Lawrence's case as that of murder, with various people arrested but later released, her fate is unclear.

Background
Claudia Lawrence was born in Malton, North Yorkshire in 1974. She spent her early life with her father Peter (died 2021), mother Joan and older sister Ali. Lawrence's father was a prosperous solicitor. Her mother was a member of Malton Town Council and served a term as mayor of the town.

Lawrence enjoyed a comfortable childhood and was privately educated at the York College for Girls. She later attended a local catering college and qualified as a chef. She initially worked at several hotels and restaurants in York, but became tired of the unsocial hours this involved. In 2006 she found employment at the University of York's Goodricke College, working as a chef in the canteen of the university's main campus. In 2007 Lawrence purchased a terraced cottage in the York suburb of Heworth, situated about three miles from her place of work. Lawrence was considered punctual and reliable by her employer.

Lawrence remained single throughout her life while enjoying a gregarious social life. She was reported to have engaged in a series of short-term relationships often conducted on a concurrent basis. She had "a number of covert sexual relationships with men, some of whom were married ... before she disappeared". Lawrence was discreet about this and her family knew little about her relationships with men. This aspect of her lifestyle would later cause some media speculation and would also influence the police investigation of her disappearance. After moving to Heworth in 2007, Lawrence would regularly spend evenings at The Nag's Head pub close to her home. "Lawrence began relationships with several men whom she met while drinking in the pub, and her father admitted that the liaisons had created 'awkward situations' with her lovers' partners".

Lawrence had holidayed several times in Cyprus, where she was believed to have explored job opportunities.

Disappearance

Last known whereabouts
At 6 am on the morning of Wednesday, 18 March 2009, Lawrence started her shift at Goodricke College's Roger Kirk Centre. She completed her shift at 2 pm and was recorded on CCTV leaving the college on foot a few minutes later. Around 3 pm she was recorded on CCTV passing a shop in Melrosegate near her home and was seen by a neighbour. During the course of the evening Lawrence spoke to both her father and mother on her mobile phone. Her mother described Lawrence's mood as normal and relaxed. The two women discussed celebrating the forthcoming Mother's Day. Lawrence told her mother she was at home and that she planned to retire early since she would have to rise before 5 am next day in order to walk to work, her car being under repair. She sent a final text message from her mobile phone at 8:23 pm and a final incoming text was received at 9:12 pm. Thereafter nobody is known to have seen or heard from Lawrence.

Reported missing
On Thursday, 19 March, Lawrence was scheduled to start work at 6 am. She did not report for duty. Her manager called her mobile phone number but although the phone rang, the call was directed to voice messaging. The manager took no further action. Lawrence had previously arranged to meet her friend Suzy Cooper at The Nag's Head that night. Cooper attended the appointment but Lawrence did not. Cooper then attempted to contact Lawrence by telephone. Lawrence was normally a prolific user of her mobile, a Samsung SGH-D900, so Cooper was surprised when she was unable to attract a response. Cooper attempted to contact Lawrence again on the morning of Friday, 20 March, but again without success. At this point Cooper became alarmed and contacted mutual acquaintances including George Forman, landlord of The Nag's Head, to obtain information concerning her possible whereabouts.

Cooper telephoned Claudia's father Peter on 20 March to report the situation. Peter telephoned his daughter's manager at Goodricke College and was told that she had not reported for duty on either 19 or 20 March. Peter then entered Claudia's home using his own key in company with George Forman. The two men found the house to be in an orderly state. The bed was made and there were unwashed dishes in the kitchen sink, suggesting she had eaten breakfast. Lawrence's handbag containing her purse, bank cards and passport was in the house. The only significant items missing were her mobile phone, a set of hair straighteners and a rucksack which she normally used to carry her chef's whites to and from work. Indications were that Lawrence had left the house normally to go to work at around 5 am on the morning of 19 March, but had never arrived.

The North Yorkshire Police (NYP) was contacted at around 2 pm on 20 March in order to report Lawrence as a missing person. Police officers met with Lawrence's father at her home later that day. NYP was initially slow to act on grounds that Lawrence was not a vulnerable person and there was no obvious evidence of violence. They considered it likely that she had decided to absent herself and would reappear after a few days. However, NYP officers checked her route to work and sent out a public request for information. Lawrence's family became increasingly insistent that she must have been  abducted. After five weeks NYP upgraded the enquiry from a missing person one to one of suspected murder.

Case progress

Original investigation
The original NYP investigation of Lawrence's disappearance considered various possibilities, including:

 That Lawrence had left with a new lover or to take up a new job or merely to take a break. In recent years, there have been an average of around 3,500 missing persons reports per year in the NYP area. The large majority of these cases are quickly resolved when the missing person reappears. However, as time went on Lawrence's family became increasingly insistent that she would have contacted them had she been able to do so. This possibility was eventually dismissed.
 That Lawrence had suffered an accident or medical emergency on her way into work. The route from her home to place of work was checked at an early stage and no trace of her was found. This possibility was quickly dismissed.
 That Lawrence had been the victim of a chance encounter with a serial killer or other crazed individual. Reports were made of various people behaving strangely in the Heworth area in the days leading up to Lawrence's disappearance. These reports were investigated but without conclusive result. Cases of known serial killers who might have been active in the area were also considered but discounted.
 That Lawrence had been the victim of a person known to her. Detectives soon began to favour this explanation. Most murder victims knew their killer.

One critical piece of evidence was that Lawrence's mobile phone remained on until 12:10 pm on 19 March, at which time it was deliberately switched off. It was determined that the phone had been connected to a mast in the Heworth area of York throughout the morning of 19 March and up to the point it was switched off. This indicates that the phone itself did not leave the local area. The only CCTV camera on Lawrence's most direct route to work was at the Melrosegate Post Office, and the recording from the morning of 19 March did not show Lawrence passing. Although that is not critical since she might have passed out of camera view or used a parallel street.

The independent crime-fighting charity Crimestoppers offered a reward of £10,000 to anyone providing information which would lead to the arrest and conviction of any person linked to the disappearance. NYP received over 1,200 calls offering information. An appeal for help was made by John Sentamu, the Archbishop of York. In early June 2009, a reconstruction of Lawrence's last known movements was featured in an appeal on BBC One's Crimewatch. Also in June, 100 days after his daughter went missing, Peter Lawrence launched a YouTube appeal for information. In late August 2009, NYP and the Lawrence family used the annual Whitby Regatta in North Yorkshire to publicise the campaign.

In September 2009, NYP revealed that the search for Lawrence had been extended to Cyprus. Detective Superintendent Ray Galloway stated that Lawrence "knew several people who live on the island" and that she may have "received job offers" while there. Galloway also stated that some people who had been interviewed had been "reluctant and less than candid" when spoken to, and that a team of officers had been sent to Cyprus to interview people whom Lawrence met there. It was reported that the last text message received by Lawrence was from a man who was on the island.

Later in September, detectives made a search of an area of the University of York campus. In October, NYP revealed they were looking for the driver of a "rusty white van" who was seen trying to talk to women on Lawrence's route to work in the days before she disappeared. On 24 March 2010, NYP began searching areas of Heslington in York, based on new information received "in the last few days". On 24 March, land near to a children's play area, near a muddy farm track, was searched, and on 25 March the search was relocated to a field near to the university, an area of land which is bordered by a playing field and student accommodation. Nothing of significance was discovered. The search at Heslington was later considered to have been prompted by hoax information.

Galloway indicated that the probable explanation for Lawrence's disappearance lay in her lifestyle, principally in the "complexity and mystery" of her relationships with men. The investigation centred around construction of a "rogue's gallery" of the men she had been involved with. One Sky News journalist stated, "Claudia apparently lived a significant part of her life in secret. For a privately educated daughter of a country solicitor, Claudia had some unusual acquaintances and this remains the only missing person case where I have been warned off or threatened – not once but twice". The general finding which emerged from the original enquiry was that Lawrence had probably been abducted and murdered shortly after leaving home on 19 March. It was considered likely that her killer was a local man known to her.

2013 Major Crime Unit review
In June 2013, NYP announced the £300,000 creation of a new Major Crime Unit (MCU), set up to ease the burden on day-to-day policing. Based in Harrogate, the MCU was to be tasked from October 2013 to handle crimes including rape and kidnap, and review cold cases. In July 2013, NYP said the unit would assess several "stalled" cases when it opened in October, including Lawrence's disappearance.

The MCU subsequently assessed the Lawrence case and carried out new forensic searches at her home on Heworth Road. Using what were described as "advanced techniques not available in 2009", the MCU found additional fingerprints and a man's DNA on a cigarette end in her car. Work surrounding her mobile phone showed from cell site activity that she had spent time in the Acomb area of York in the weeks leading up to her disappearance. On the fifth anniversary of the disappearance, a new appeal was made on Crimewatch, which aired on 19 March 2014. CCTV footage, recovered in 2009, showed a silver Ford Focus hatchback car, manufactured between 1998 and 2004, driving along Heworth Road. The car's brake lights come on as it approaches level with Lawrence's cottage.

The new investigation, led by Detective Dai Malyn, made a number of arrests. On 13 May 2014, a 59-year-old man was arrested by NYP on suspicion of Lawrence's murder. He lived close to her home and had been a colleague of hers at the University of York. The two were reported to have been on friendly terms and he had often given her lifts in his car to and from work. Searches were made of the suspect's house in York and his mother's house in North Shields, Tyneside. He was released on police bail the following day and then released from his bail without charge in November of that year. In July 2014, NYP arrested Paul Harris, the landlord of The Acomb pub (since renamed as The Clockhouse pub) in York on suspicion of perverting the course of justice. Harris was quickly released without charge. He complained that the police had excavated a section of the cellar floor of his pub. Harris stated that Lawrence had been a customer at his pub in the weeks before her disappearance and he had spoken to her, but stated that was his only connection with her. Other arrests were made later. But those concerned were all released and none were charged.

On 8 March 2016, the Crown Prosecution Service refused to pursue a case submitted by NYP against four men who had been arrested on suspicion of murder, citing lack of evidence. The suspects had all been regular customers of The Nag's Head. They all denied any involvement in Lawrence's disappearance. The NYP complained about a lack of co-operation from witnesses. The second investigation then ended having achieved little.

Further investigations
The search was reportedly prompted by new evidence although police would not state what that new evidence was. The land had been used as fishing ponds since 1969. Police drained one of the lakes on site to allow a fingertip examination of the lake's bed. Ground-penetrating radar equipment and cadaver dogs were used in the search. At the end of the search detective Wayne Fox, senior investigating officer in the Lawrence case, stated that nothing significant had been found.

Alleged links to other cases

In his 2017 book, Catching a Serial Killer: My hunt for murderer Christopher Halliwell, Stephen Fulcher, the senior investigating officer in the murder of Sian O'Callaghan, suggests there are similarities between the Lawrence and O'Callaghan cases. O’Callaghan left a Swindon nightclub at near 3am and started the 20 minute walk to her home. A licensed taxi driven by Halliwell pulled up beside her and she was offered a ride to her home. She seems to have accepted this offer. Instead of taking O’Callaghan home Halliwell drove her to a secluded place where he murdered her. It is notable that O’Callaghan was murdered by Halliwell on 19 March 2011 and her body was concealed. Although convicted of only two murders Halliwell has been linked to many other violent offences against women involving assaults, rapes, disappearances and murders. The date 19 March figures in a number of these cases and this date is believed to have had some significance to Halliwell. One such case is the disappearance of Swindon teacher Linda Razzell on 19 March 2002 while walking to work. However, Razzell's husband was convicted of her murder and her family have stated that they have no doubt over his guilt and conviction. In 2018 highly-regarded miscarriage of justice organisation Inside Justice investigated the Razzell case (and the alleged links to Halliwell) as part of a BBC documentary, Conviction, but it concluded that the conviction was safe and stated there was nothing linking Halliwell to the crime other than speculation.

In 2009 Halliwell was living in Swindon, Wiltshire, the location of the two murders he was convicted of. In his book, Stephen Fulcher stated that Halliwell had links to Yorkshire because his father lived there, however, his father lived in Huddersfield, some distance from York, and his father had died several years before Lawrence's disappearance. Both NYP and Wiltshire Police have stated that there is no direct evidence linking Halliwell to the Lawrence case, and Wiltshire Police have disclosed that they have CCTV evidence of Halliwell buying petrol at a petrol station in Swindon on the evening before Lawrence disappeared. Nevertheless, some observers believe that the NYP's focus on Lawrence's lifestyle and social circle may have been misguided. In regard to Halliwell's possible involvement Lawrence's mother stated "The police may not have proved he had anything to do with my daughter’s disappearance, but they haven’t disproved it either".

Aftermath, "Claudia’s Law"
Lawrence’s disappearance caused difficulty arising out of her family's inability to manage her assets and liabilities. Notably, they were unable to sell her house on which mortgage and other charges continued to accrue. Lawrence's father Peter, a solicitor, campaigned for the law to be modified in order to allow the appointment of guardians for the affairs of missing people. This campaigning eventually succeeded with the passing of "The Guardianship (Missing Persons) Act 2017" which was introduced to Parliament as a Private Members' Bill. The Bill, which came into force in July 2019, allows the family of a missing person to apply to the court for guardianship of that person's estate 90 days after the disappearance. The new law became popularly known as "Claudia's Law".

See also

List of people who disappeared
Disappearance of Suzy Lamplugh

References

Further reading

External links
 Find Claudia website

2009 in England
2000s in York
2000s missing person cases
March 2009 events in the United Kingdom
Missing person cases in England